Krishnaraja Boulevard is an important street of Mysore city in Karnataka state of India.

Location
Krishnaraja Boulevard is located on the southern side of Mysore between Saraswathipuram and Ballal Circle.

History

Krishnaraja Boulevard is considered as one of the historic streets of Mysore city.  It is maintained with grills on the median and planted with flowering trees on either sides.

Diminishing Glamour
Recently the glamour road has been neglected by the civic authorities and people have started using it as a parking space for vehicles.

Historic Buildings
This double road is dotted with many historic buildings like the Oriental Library, Maharajas College and the Deputy Commissioner Office, the District Court Complex, Urs Boarding School, College of Architecture and Yuvarajas College.  The main office of the Mysore University otherwise known as the Crawford Hall is also located here.

Length
The boulevard is about one km long beginning from the underbridge junction near Balla circle ending at the Hunsur Road on the northern side. According to famous Heritage expert Prof NS Rangaraju, the boulevard is one of the 15 roads identified by the city council for its heritage value.

Image gallery

See also
 Oriental Library
 Maharajas College
 Chamarajapuram railway station
 Ballal Circle
 Crawford Hall

References

Suburbs of Mysore